Joseph Caleb Odom (born January 9, 1992) is an American professional baseball catcher who is currently a free agent. He previously played in Major League Baseball (MLB) for the Seattle Mariners and Tampa Bay Rays.

Career
Odom attended Vestavia Hills High School in Vestavia Hills, Alabama. He played for the school's baseball team as a catcher, serving as a defensive replacement. He did not begin to start for Vestavia Hills until he lost weight in his junior year. He graduated from Vestavia Hills in 2010, and enrolled at Huntingdon College, where played college baseball for the Huntingdon Hawks. In 2013, he had a .369 batting average and led all of NCAA Division III with 14 home runs.

Atlanta Braves
The Atlanta Braves selected Odom in the 13th round of the 2013 MLB draft. After he signed with Atlanta, he played in Minor League Baseball at the Rookie-level, before receiving a promotion to the Lynchburg Hillcats of the Class A-Advanced Carolina League in 2014. He spent the 2015 season with the Carolina Mudcats of the Carolina League in 2015, and was invited by the Braves to spring training as a non-roster player in 2016.

Seattle Mariners
The Mariners selected Odom from the Braves in the minor league portion of the 2017 Rule 5 draft. The Mariners promoted Odom to the MLB for the first time on July 28, 2020. He made his MLB debut that night. Odom was outrighted off of the 40-man roster on October 19, 2020.

Tampa Bay Rays
On December 16, 2020, Odom signed a minor league contract with the Tampa Bay Rays organization. On April 3, 2021, Odom was selected to the 40-man roster to take the roster spot of Ryan Sherriff, who had been placed on the restricted list. On April 9, Odom was designated for assignment after Hunter Strickland was added to the roster. In his time with Tampa, he registered two hitless at-bats. On April 12, Odom was outrighted to the alternate training site. On October 16, 2021, Odom elected free agency.

Seattle Mariners (second stint)
On March 28, 2022, Odom signed a minor league contract with the Seattle Mariners organization. He was released on August 17, 2022.

References

External links

1992 births
Living people
Arkansas Travelers players
Baseball players from Birmingham, Alabama
Carolina Mudcats players
Danville Braves players
Durham Bulls players
Gulf Coast Braves players
Gwinnett Braves players
Huntingdon Hawks athletes
Lynchburg Hillcats players
Major League Baseball catchers
Mississippi Braves players
Peoria Javelinas players
Seattle Mariners players
Tacoma Rainiers players
Tampa Bay Rays players